Ernest Delahaye (1853–1930) was a French writer and essayist. He maintained a long and close friendship with Arthur Rimbaud whom he first met in April 1865 when they attended school together in Charleville in the Ardennes region of France. He and Rimbaud had a shared interest in poetry, and he would help Rimbaud by making fair copies of his drafts for distribution to Rimbaud's literary friends. He was one of the few (seven) recipients of the privately printed A Season in Hell, though Rimbaud later asked for it back to give it to someone else. According to Rimbaud biographer, Charles Nicholl, Rimbaud's "[last] strictly dateable poem" was contained in a letter to Delahaye of 14 October 1875. Through Rimbaud, Delahaye also met poet Paul Verlaine and became friendly with him. Verlaine wrote a poem - Sonnet Boiteux - which is dedicated to him. Delahaye mixed his civil service career, working at the Education Ministry, with writing biographical material on both Rimbaud and Verlaine, contributing first-hand accounts of the poets' lives and families.

Works

Notes

Sources

External links

 Rimbaud, the Artist and the Moral Being (excerpt) translated from the French in The Black Herald magazine, issue 3, 2012

1853 births
1930 deaths
French biographers
French male writers
French male essayists
Arthur Rimbaud
French male poets
Male biographers